The Mildenitz is a river of Mecklenburg-Vorpommern, Germany. It flows into the Warnow near Sternberger Burg. Its source is near Karow. Its course leads through a number of lakes: Damerower See, Goldberger See, Dobbertiner See, Schwarzer See, Borkower See, Rothener See, Trenntsee and Großer Sternberger See.

See also
List of rivers of Mecklenburg-Vorpommern

Rivers of Mecklenburg-Western Pomerania
Rivers of Germany